Parshin (Russian: Паршин) (feminine: Parshina) is a Russian-language surname. It may refer to:

Aleksandr Parshin, Russian footballer
, Russian mathematician, the namesake of the terms "Parshin chain" and "Parshin's conjecture"
Denis Parshin, Russian ice hockey player
Georgy Parshin, Soviet World War II pilot, twice Hero of the Soviet Union
Nikolai Parshin, Soviet footballer
Lana Parshina, Russian-American journalist and filmmaker
Daria Parshina, Russian swimmer

Russian-language surnames